There are the following lists of Korean names:
List of Korean given names
List of the most popular given names in South Korea
List of Korean family names
List of South Korean surnames by prevalence

See also
Korean name
:Category:Korean-language surnames
:Category:Korean given names